Imperial Royale Hotel is a hotel in Kampala, Uganda's capital city.

Location
The Imperial Royale Hotel is located on Kintu Road, on Nakasero Hill, in the heart of one of Kampala's most exclusive neighborhoods. Nearby landmarks include the Kampala Sheraton Hotel, the 5-star Kampala Serena Hotel and Kampala Speke Hotel. The coordinates of Imperial Royale Hotel are:00 19 08N, 32 35 08E (Latitude:0.3189; Longitude:32.5854).

Overview
The hotel opened in 2007, in time for the Commonwealth Heads of Government Meeting 2007, which took place in Kampala in November 2007. The hotel served as the media center for the meeting. The hotel has 275 rooms, including ten (10) suites. It has extensive underground parking, enough to accommodate 600 vehicles. Imperial Royale Hotel is a popular location for conferences.
The hotel ballroom is also the filming location for the  Zain Africa Challenge.

Ownership
The hotel is a member of the Imperial Hotels Group, which owns three hotels in Kampala and another three in Entebbe. As of July 2014, the group's hotels and real estate holdings, include the following:

 Kampala, Uganda
 Imperial Royale Hotel
 Grand Imperial Hotel
 Equatoria Shopping Mall

 Entebbe, Uganda
 Imperial Botanical Beach Hotel
 Imperial Resort Beach Hotel 
 Imperial Golf View Hotel

See also
 Imperial Hotels Group
 List of tallest buildings in Kampala

External links
 Hotel Homepage
 Overview at Hotelsinuganda.com
 Overview of Kampala Hotels at Ugandatravelguide.com

Photos
 Photo of Imperial Royale Hotel in 2007

References

Hotels in Kampala
Kampala Central Division
Hotel buildings completed in 2007
2007 establishments in Uganda